Hog Lake  may refer to the following bodies of water:

Canada:
 Hog Lake, Argyle, Nova Scotia 
 Hog Lake, Region of Queens Municipality, Nova Scotia 
 Hog Lake, near Kearney, Ontario

United States:
 Hog Lake, near Dales, California
 Hog Lake (Florida) 
 Hog Lake, Santa Fe Township, Clinton County, Illinois
 Hog Lake, LaPorte County, Indiana
 Hog Lake, Jamestown Township, Steuben County, Indiana
 Hog Lake, near Sumner, Missouri, drained in 1911
 Hog Canyon Lake, also known as Hog Lake, Spokane County, Washington